Victor is a fictional character portrayed by Enver Gjokaj in the Fox science fiction series Dollhouse, created by Joss Whedon. Within the series' narrative, Victor is an "Active" or a "doll", one of a group of men and women who can be programmed with memories and skills to engage in particular assignments; in their default state, Actives are innocent, childlike and suggestible. Before having his memories wiped, Victor's name was Anthony Ceccoli. Although Victor does not exhibit the same self-awareness that Echo has, he develops feelings such as love in his doll state.

Character

Before the Dollhouse
Sergeant Anthony Ceccoli was an Afghanistan war veteran with severe posttraumatic stress disorder (PTSD) which he was cured of in exchange for a five-year contract with the Dollhouse. He was transferred straight into the LA Dollhouse and did not meet with Adelle DeWitt as per the usual procedure (in this sense, he is similar to prison recruit Karl William Kraft and psychiatric ward recruit Priya Tsetsang). For the next five years, he serves as doll called Victor.
In S1: "Echoes", under the effects of the psychoactive drug N-7316, Victor (as Tom Voran) experiences a memory glitch: a flashback where he is a soldier trying to save a young woman in a war zone. She panics and runs off, setting off an explosive. In S1: "Needs", Victor is imprinted as Anthony without any memories as part of an exercise to let the Actives achieve a sense of past life closure: Victor's ends when he kisses Sierra (imprinted as real self, Priya). Their attachment to one another is shown in every identity either pair assumes, whether that means blank state, engagement identity or their real selves. When Victor and Sierra put paint on one another's faces in S2: "Belonging", he flashes to Anthony's memory of another soldier asking him for orders in the middle of a war zone. Victor then collapses into Sierra's arms, weeping that he doesn't want to be in charge. When he is released in S2: "Stop-Loss", even the blank state Sierra is able to say he's not ready yet, indicating that his PTSD lingers with Victor at least until he is restored to his original personality. Also prior to the Dollhouse, Victor seems to be a baseball fan, as he is able to recite the entire New York Mets line-up in "Needs"

In the Dollhouse
Victor was originally introduced as Lubov, Paul Ballard's informant inside the Russian mob, before being revealed to be a Doll in the third episode. The character is also regularly hired out by Adelle DeWitt herself to be her lover, whom she truly appears to love. In his mind-wiped state, Victor is inexplicably attracted to Sierra despite numerous attempts to wipe away his memories of and feelings for her.

Victor, along with Echo and Sierra, is part of a trio of Dolls who continually seek out each other's company during down time at the Dollhouse. Topher Brink writes this off as "herd" behavior, but the three Dolls show signs of human friendship. Topher first notices something more suspicious than herd behavior when, in "True Believer," he observes Victor's erection when in his doll state, which is not supposed to happen. Victor has obviously started to show signs of attraction toward Sierra though he may not realize it at the moment. He has, however, been employed by the Dollhouse long enough to have attracted a regular client, a woman nicknamed "Miss Lonelyhearts" by the Dollhouse staff. Topher and Dr. Claire Saunders review the surveillance footage of the showers and notice that Victor responds to Sierra's presence, not to any residual imprinting from his engagements with Miss Lonelyhearts. Adelle responds to this news by ordering Victor to be "scrubbed." "Spy in the House of Love" shows that "Miss Lonelyhearts" is actually Adelle, who has been hiring Victor secretly as "Roger," a suave Englishman. After the events of the episode, Adelle says "Miss Lonelyhearts" will no longer be hiring "Roger."

In "Man on the Street," Victor is suspected of raping Sierra. The evidence seems stacked against him: she screams in response to his touch, she is found to have been having sex recently, and she tells the staff that Victor likes to "pretend they were married." After these events, at Langton's instruction, Dollhouse staff members detain Victor and his substitute handler, Bicks (his regular handler is Selena Ramirez). The detention confuses and upsets Victor because, as he tells Echo, he can't understand why Sierra screamed at him, and nobody has told him what action had gotten him into trouble. Fortunately for Victor, he and his handler's incarceration is just a ruse by Langton in order to flush out the real culprit, Joe Hearn, Sierra's handler. Afterwards, Sierra is wiped in order for her to forget the ordeals, and Victor goes to see her while she is reading. He is happy that Sierra is back to her calm self, and after asking her, he sits down to read a book with her.
In "Needs", Victor notes to Sierra that he is aware of what is happening to him while in the Dollhouse but is unable to do anything, in a sense being trapped in his own body and mind. This would suggest he is also developing sentience but in a different way to Echo. He even mentions that he saw Sierra being raped but couldn't do anything because of his doll state. He also always stays up to watch Sierra go to sleep to make sure she is all right, showing more of a developing bond. When he and Sierra encountered Nolan he displayed a protective nature to Sierra by attacking Nolan for what he did to her.

In "Briar Rose", Victor is imprinted with Laurence Dominic's personality to answer a question about a mysterious flash drive. Later, he is awoken in his sleeping pod when a fight between Boyd and Paul breaks the cover, giving him minor scratches. Claire finds him and takes him to her office, where Alpha is lying in wait. Alpha slashes Victor's face with a knife. In "Omega", Dr. Saunders tends to Victor's scarred face. Victor realizes he isn't "my best" anymore, and Saunders is unable to comfort him, even angrily announcing that now he is stuck being ugly. In "Vows", Victor undergoes an expensive treatment to repair his scars, at Adelle's personal request.

In "Belle Chose", Victor is imprinted with the mind of Terry Karrens, a comatose serial killer, in order to find out where his victims are. Terry/Victor then escapes and goes looking for another victim. Topher's attempt to remote wipe him instead results in swapping imprints with Echo, and he receives the Kiki imprint. Kiki's college girl behavior in Victor's male body leads to an altercation with some club patrons which Paul rescues "her" from.

"Belonging" shows that Victor was one of the Actives hired by Nolan Kinnard to help him seduce Priya Tsetsang. Even in this state, as early as their first encounter he demonstrates that he is attracted to and protective of her. In the present, Victor tries to help Sierra's distress by getting rid of the black paint in the art class, but this sets off another war flashback. When Sierra is sent away, he sits and waits patiently for her to return. The episode ends with him and Sierra cuddling in a sleep pod while Echo watches over them.

In "The Left Hand", Topher imprints Victor with a copy of his own mind to stay in Los Angeles and assist him in recovering Echo from the D.C. Dollhouse. In "Meet Jane Doe", Matthew Harding has Victor and Sierra are imprinted as a research & development scientists working under Topher to perfect the remote wipe technology. When their successes are demonstrated, Victor and Sierra cannot contain their joys and they begin kissing. Topher wipes them, but Harding nevertheless notices they are "grouping" and recommends splitting them up. In "A Love Supreme", Victor is programmed as a Jewish psychologist (nicknamed "Dr Freudenstein" to analyse the new, wholly self-aware Echo's mental state. Later, like all the other dolls, he is remotely imprinted by Alpha to attack the Dollhouse employees; Topher wipes him with the new device.

Post-Dollhouse 
When Anthony is released into the real world after five years in the Dollhouse, he has some trouble adjusting. He stays at a hotel and now has a considerable sum of money. At a nightclub he sees a young Asian woman who he mistakes for Sierra. He sleeps in his shower because it recreates the sleeping pod environment of the Dollhouse. He is then captured by Scytheon, a Rossum Corporation-sponsored paramilitary group which recruits ex-Actives into a hive mind supersoldier unit. They are also all ex-soldiers, some of whom Anthony recognizes. Programmer Topher Brink notices when Anthony's biolink feed went offline (still in his 'adjustment' period), so Boyd investigates with the Active Echo, who is self-aware and can access multiple personality skills. Echo is loaded up with more personality and skills packages, and Sierra is imprinted as Priya, and the two track down Anthony. Anthony is able to overcome group mind programming because of Priya's presence. Echo enters into the hive mind and overpowers it with her 40+ consciousnesses. Anthony and Priya are set to escape, but are instead rendered unconscious by DeWitt using the Disruptor, and returned to the Dollhouse, from where they are sent to the Attic by Adelle DeWitt.

In the Attic, Victor is caught in a simulation, an infinite loop of war time nightmares. The consciousnesses of Laurence Dominic and Echo enter his scenario. The three track a shadow creature called "Arcane" into Priya's nightmare; when they catch it, the group meet Clyde Randolph, a Rossum founder and the first victim of the Attic. Clyde reveals the Attic is a network of brains that form a supercomputer; by killing off consciousnesses as Arcane, he reduces the "CPU count" and impairs Rossum's progress. His nightmare is an outcome simulator: in short, a 97% probable future of societal collapse, as caused by the Dollhouse technology. Anthony, along with Echo and Sierra, allow themselves to be killed in the Attic with the hope they can wake up again after flat-lining and disengaging from the computer system. Anthony stabs Priya, and lets the mob outside kill him. They are successful, and Adelle DeWitt later informs them that she sent Echo (and them) to the Attic to retrieve information on how to defeat Rossum.

Relationships

Sierra
In the episode "True Believer" it comes to the attention of both Topher and Dr. Saunders that Victor is having erections. Upon further investigation, it is shown that Victor is actually attracted to Sierra. While being interviewed after Sierra was raped, Victor was asked how Sierra made him feel. He states that she makes him feel better.

Dr. Saunders has also observed Victor's feelings towards Sierra. During the self-fulfillment exercise Sierra needed to confront Nolan for putting her in the Dollhouse. Victor accompanies her. During their time together they remember details about their doll state. Sierra recalls how Victor always makes sure she is fine before they go to sleep in the pods. They swear to each to keep looking out for each other before sharing a kiss. Boyd wonders what Victor's self-fulfillment was. Dr. Saunders believes he loves her.

Sierra has seemingly reciprocated feelings towards Victor. In the closing scenes of the episode "Vows" they walk past each other and Sierra notices the scars on Victor's face are gone. They hold hands and walk off together.

Priya admits she is in love with Victor in the episode "Belonging." When Sierra was due for a treatment, Victor attempted to come with her, however Topher stops Victor and he waits for Sierra to return. Priya states to Nolan she is in love with someone she does not even know. Upon seeing Victor back in the Dollhouse, she asks Topher if the love is real. He says it is and that the feelings are mutual. After being wiped Sierra and Victor walk off holding hands and are eventually seen sleeping in a pod together.

In "Epitaph Two: Return" it is revealed that Priya and Victor have a child, "T" (Tony), and she is furious over Victor's decision to leave them and become a Techhead. At the end they are a family once more and were last seen reading a story to T while waiting underground in the Los Angeles Dollhouse.

Adelle Dewitt
Adelle hires out doll Victor as Roger, a British businessman, under the alias Ms. Lonelyhearts/Catherine for both her emotional and sexual needs.

See also
 List of Dollhouse characters

Science fiction television characters
Fictional soldiers
Fictional sergeants
Fictional War in Afghanistan (2001–2021) veterans
Fictional slaves
Fictional male prostitutes
Characters created by Joss Whedon
Television characters introduced in 2009